Uppsala County held a county council election on 14 September 2014, on the same day as the general and municipal elections.

Results
The number of seats remained at 71 with the Social Democrats winning the most at 24, a gain of two from 2010.

Municipalities

Images

References

Elections in Uppsala County
Uppsala